The year 2008 is the sixth year in the history of Jungle Fight, a mixed martial arts promotion based in Brazil. In 2008 Jungle Fight held 4 events beginning with, Jungle Fight 8.

Events list

Jungle Fight 8

Jungle Fight 8 was an event held on April 6, 2008 at The Team Nogueira Training Center in Rio de Janeiro, Brazil.

Results

Jungle Fight 9: Warriors

Jungle Fight 9: Warriors was an event held on May 31, 2008 at The Maracanãzinho Gymnasium in Rio de Janeiro, Brazil.

Results

Jungle Fight 10

Jungle Fight 10 was an event held on July 12, 2008 at Windsor Barra Hotel in Rio de Janeiro, Brazil.

Results

Jungle Fight 11

Jungle Fight 11 was an event held on September 13, 2008 at The Windsor Barra Hotel in Rio de Janeiro, Brazil.

Results

See also 
 Jungle Fight

References

2008 in mixed martial arts
Jungle Fight events